Hotspot, Hot Spot or Hot spot may refer to:

Places
 Hot Spot, Kentucky, a community in the United States

Arts, entertainment, and media

Fictional entities
 Hot Spot (comics), a name for the DC Comics character Isaiah Crockett
 Hot Spot (Transformers), any of several characters

Films 
 Hot Spot (1941 film), later retitled I Wake Up Screaming
 Hot Spot (1945 film), a Private Snafu film
 The Hot Spot, a 1990 neo-noir film

Other uses in arts, entertainment, and media
 Hot Spot (board game), a 1979 board game published by Metagaming Concepts
 "Hot Spot" (Burn Notice), a television episode
 Hot Spot (musical), 1963
 "Hot Spot" (song), by Foxy Brown
 Hotspot (album), a 2020 album by Pet Shop Boys
 The Hot Spot (Podcast), a GameSpot podcast

Computing 
 Hot spot (computer programming), a compute-intensive region of a program
 Hot spot, an area which is customizable by users in software frameworks
 Hotspot (Wi-Fi), a wireless network access point or area
 Connectify Hotspot, a software application for creating a wireless access point
 Mobile hotspot, sharing of a mobile device's Internet connection
 HotSpot (virtual machine), the Java Virtual Machine originally developed by Sun and the current reference implementation of the Java programming language
 Screen hotspot, an area enabled for user interactivity on a display

Science and healthcare
 Hotspot (geology), an area of unusually high volcanic activity
 Hot spot (veterinary medicine), an irritated skin lesion
 Hot spot, a location with a high level of radioactive contamination
 Biodiversity hotspot, a region of significant variety and variability of life
 Hot spot effect in subatomic physics, regions of high energy density or temperature
 Recombination hotspot, a region in a genome

Other uses
 Hot spot (casting), a metal casting defect
 Hot Spot (cricket), an infrared tracking system
 Airport hot spots, locations where aircraft collisions with ground equipment may occur
 Hotspot camp, a refugee camp that serves as an initial reception point
 Pyotraumatic dermatitis (also known as hot spots), a common skin dog infection

See also